This is a list of Dutch football transfers for the 2019 summer transfer window. Only transfers featuring Eredivisie are listed.

Eredivisie

Note: Flags indicate national team as has been defined under FIFA eligibility rules. Players may hold more than one non-FIFA nationality.

ADO Den Haag

In:

Out:

Ajax

In:

Out:

AZ Alkmaar

In:

Out:

FC Emmen

In:

Out:

FC Groningen

In:

Out:

FC Twente

In:

Out:

FC Utrecht

In:

Out:

Feyenoord

In:

 (return from loan)
 (return from loan)
 (return from loan)

 (on loan)

 (on loan)

Out:

 (on loan)
 (on loan)
 (on loan)
 (return from loan)
 (return from loan)

 (on loan)

 (on loan)
 (on loan)

Fortuna Sittard

In:

Out:

Heracles Almelo

In:

Out:

PEC Zwolle

In:

Out:

PSV Eindhoven

In:

Out:

RKC Waalwijk

In:

Out:

SC Heerenveen

In:

Out:

Sparta Rotterdam

In:

Out:

Vitesse

In:

Out:

VVV-Venlo

In:

Out:

Willem II

In:

Out:

References

Dutch
2019